Beijing Chengfeng Football Club was a professional Chinese football club that last participated in the Chinese League One under licence from the Chinese Football Association (CFA). The team was based in Fengtai District, Beijing and their home stadium was the Beijing Fengtai Stadium that has a seating capacity of 31,043. Their last majority shareholder was Chinese property developers of shopping centers Renhe Commercial Holdings Company Limited.

The club was founded in Pudong District, Shanghai on 3 February 1995 and were originally known as Shanghai Pudong before they made their debut in the third tier of China's football league pyramid in the 1995 season. They would work their way up to the top tier while changing name to accommodate their sponsors. In the 2006 season the club would relocate the team to Shaanxi and rename themselves Xi'an Chanba International, however by the 2012 season, the club relocated this time to Guizhou, and changed their name to Guizhou Renhe. In the 2016 season the club relocated the team to Fengtai District, Beijing, and changed their name to Beijing Renhe. Throughout the club's history their greatest achievement has been winning the 2013 Chinese FA Cup while the highest position they have ever finished was second within the 2003 season.

History
The club was founded on 3 February 1995 in Pudong District, Shanghai to take part in the recently formed fully professional football league system and they started at the bottom of the football pyramid in the third division, where they named themselves Shanghai Pudong. Playing in all blue in their debut season, they would immediately taste success when they won the division title and promotion to the second tier. The following seasons, however, saw the team languish within the division until they brought in Xu Genbao to manage the side at the beginning of the 2000 season and would make the club promotion contenders. Under Xu Genbao's leadership, they didn't have to wait long to win promotion when they would go on to win the division title at the end of the season and a chance to play in the top tier. Under the ownership of Shanghai Yungtay Engineering and COSCO Real Estate, the club rebranded themselves with a new blue and white striped football kit. They were big spenders who wanted to achieve immediate success by bringing in established Chinese internationals such as Cheng Yaodong, Jiang Jin and particularly Wu Chengying who set a Chinese transfer fee record of 13,000,000 RMB. This saw them become genuine title contenders and under their new manager Cheng Yaodong, they would fight for the league title with Shanghai Greenland Shenhua and only come second by a single point at the end of the 2003 season. On 13 June 2012, it was discovered by the police the real reason the team lost the 2003 title was because the club's players Shen Si, Qi Hong, Jiang Jin and Li Ming took a bribe from former Tianjin TEDA general manager Yang Yifeng to lose their 30 November 2003 game, which saw all offending participants fined and jailed for their crimes.

The owners could not maintain the level of spending that they had done and the team's results would start to slip. Finding that they could not compete with Shanghai Shenhua and in the 2005 season, they had to face additional competition in Shanghai Zobon, the team decided to move to Xi'an after months of speculation. With the newly branded team known as Shanghai International, they would start to move away from the previous Yuanshen Stadium in Shanghai to the Shaanxi Province Stadium in Xi'an, Shaanxi Province and rename themselves Xi'an Chanba International by 2006. In 2007, their ownership was transferred to Baorong Investment and it was during this period that the club would start to experiment with a new yellow football kit. This would surprisingly seem to work when the club looked as if they were title contenders once more during the 2008 season, however their title hopes quickly faded and the team eventually finished fifth. The following season, however, would see the team languish near the bottom of the table and Cheng Yaodong decided to resign, which would see former Chinese national football coach Zhu Guanghu come in and guide the team away from the relegation zone.

At the beginning of the 2010 season, Dai Yongge and the Renhe Commercial Holdings Company would start to invest heavily within the club. This would see the club bring in Chinese internationals Sun Jihai, Zhao Xuri, Qu Bo and Mao Jianqing into the team. However, despite the signings, the club struggled within the league and Zhu Guanghu left the club while three time Chinese league winner Milorad Kosanović replaced him. Milorad Kosanović's reign at the club was unsuccessful and he was soon replaced by Slobodan Santrač. After a poor string of results, Slobodan Santrač was fired and former Chinese international manager Gao Hongbo came into the club while it languished in mid-table throughout much of the 2011 season. After another disappointing season, Dia Yongge would start to get frustrated at the team's lack of success and decided to take advantage of Guiyang's government promise of the recently developed Guiyang Olympic Centre for the club, and with Renhe Commercial Holdings Company having better business connections within Guiyang, the club decided that it would move the team, which has recently made them one of the best supported teams in China. The 2012 season saw Guizhou have a successful year, with the club achieving fourth place and gaining entry into its first AFC Champions League.

The team's success continued as they qualified for the 2014 AFC Champions League as well, but got knocked out in the group stage both times they qualified. Their top achievements in this period included winning the 2014 Chinese FA Super Cup and the 2013 Chinese FA Cup. In the 2015 season they were relegated to the League One, but the team managed to advance back to the Super League in 2018. In 2016 they moved from Guizhou to Beijing, becoming Beijing Renhe. After one season where they placed eighth, in 2019 the club struggled to win games and found themselves in last place with a few rounds to go.

Having lost their 2020 China League One relegation play-off matches 2–3 on aggregate to Jiangxi Liansheng, Beijing Renhe were relegated to the League Two. They changed their name to Beijing Chengfeng to meet Chinese Football Association's "neutral name" requirement, before the dissolution of the club on 29 March 2021.

Ownership and naming history

Crest and colours
When the club originated their home colours would predominantly be blue until the club won promotion to the top tier and decided that they needed to differentiate themselves from their local rivals Shanghai Greenland Shenhua, who also play in blue. This saw them employ a blue and white stripe top at the beginning of the 2003 league season and a new crest design of a horse in front of a striped background which was directly inspired by Juventus F.C. own logo. When the club was bought out by Baorong Investments who moved the club to Xi'an they decided that the club should use a new yellow top by the beginning of the 2008 league season and a new crest of a wolf was employed. When the Renhe Commercial Holdings Company bought a majority within the club they wanted to try out a new all black kit during the 2011 league season, however this colour did not last very long and when the company decided to move the club to Guizhou the club decided they needed a new kit to signify this move and launched an all orange kit at the beginning of the 2012 league season.

Kit evolution

Rivalries
When the club was founded in Shanghai they decided to take advantage of the 1994 Chinese football league professionalism reforms that allowed more than one club in each city. With Shanghai Shenhua already established within the city the potential for China's first top-flight city derby emerged. On 9 March 2002 the first top-flight city derby became a reality when they met in a league game, which saw the club win 2–0 away to Shenhua in front of a sold out Hongkou Football Stadium. Known as the Shanghai derby it would be the start of an intense but short rivalry between the two clubs, which reached its peak on the final day of the 2003 league season with both teams able to win the league title. Shenhua won their game while the club surprisingly lost theirs to relegation fighting club Tianjin TEDA. This saw critics dispute the title win and it was eventually discovered that both teams had players and officials match-fix games throughout the campaign. Shenhua would retrospectively lose their title while the club owners decided it was financially unviable to remain in Shanghai and relocated their team to Xi'an, which effectively ended the rivalry.

Foreign players

 Africa
  Ayub Masika 

 Europe
 Bosnia and Herzegovina
  Zvjezdan Misimović
  Sejad Salihović
  Zlatan Muslimović 

 Bulgaria
  Metodi Stoynev 

 Croatia
  Ivan Bulat
  Ivan Brečević 
  Nikica Jelavić 

 Germany
  Mike Hanke 

 Italy
  Fabio Firmani 

 Netherlands
  Elvis Manu 

 Poland
  Krzysztof Mączyński 

 Scotland
  Derek Riordan 

 Serbia
  Miloš Bajalica

 Slovakia
  Tomáš Oravec

 Spain
  Rafa Jordà
  Rubén Suárez 
   Nano

 Sweden
   Magnus Erkisson
  Guillermo Molins 

 North America
  Marvin Ávila 

 South America
 Argentina
  Augusto Fernández

Coaching staff

Managerial history
Managers who have coached the club and team since Guizhou Renhe was formed.

 Wang Houjun (1995–96)
 Zheng Yan (1996)
 Marcelo (1997)
 Sundli (1997)
 Zheng Yan (1998)
 Yin Lihua (1998–99)
 Bob Houghton (2000)
 Xi Zhikang (2000)
 Xu Genbao (1 Nov 2000 – 30 Nov 2001)
 Claude Le Roy (1 July 2001 – 30 June 2003)
 Cheng Yaodong (1 May 2003 – 27 Aug 2009)
 Gong Lei (interim)
 Zhu Guanghu (1 July 2009 – 30 June 2010)
 Milorad Kosanović (1 May 2010 – 31 Dec 2011)
 Slobodan Santrač (19 July 2011 – Sept 22, 2011)
 Gao Hongbo (1 Jan 2012 – 30 Nov 2012)
 Gong Lei (interim) (17 Dec 2012 – 23 April 2014)
 Zhu Jiong (interim) (23 April 2014 – 28 April 2015)
 Li Chunman (interim) (28 April 2015 – 8 July 2015)
 Gong Lei (8 July 2015 – 8 December 2015)
 Wang Baoshan (8 December 2015 – 8 June 2017)
 Luis García Plaza (8 June 2017 – 10 December 2018)
 Aleksandar Stanojević (18 December 2018– 9 July 2019)
 Luis García Plaza (9 July 2019– 12 November 2019)
 Wang Bo (12 November 2019- )

Honours

League
Chinese Jia-A League/Chinese Super League (Top Tier League)
Runner-up (1): 2003

Chinese Jia B League/Chinese League One (Second Tier League)
Winners (1): 2001
Runner-up (1): 2017

Chinese Yi League/Chinese League Two (Third Tier League)
Winners (1): 1995

Cup
Chinese FA Cup
Winners (1): 2013
Runner-up (1): 2012

Chinese FA Super Cup
Winners (1): 2014

Results

All-time league rankings

As of the end of 2019 season.

Key
<div>

 Pld = Played
 W = Games won
 D = Games drawn
 L = Games lost
 F = Goals for
 A = Goals against
 Pts = Points
 Pos = Final position

 DNQ = Did not qualify
 DNE = Did not enter
 NH = Not Held
 – = Does Not Exist
 R1 = Round 1
 R2 = Round 2
 R3 = Round 3
 R4 = Round 4

 F = Final
 SF = Semi-finals
 QF = Quarter-finals
 R16 = Round of 16
 Group = Group stage
 GS2 = Second Group stage
 QR1 = First Qualifying Round
 QR2 = Second Qualifying Round
 QR3 = Third Qualifying Round

Continental Records

References

External links
official website 
fan website 
Stats on Sohu 
Stats on Sina 
Fans group on Baidu 

Beijing Renhe F.C.
Defunct football clubs in Beijing
Association football clubs established in 1995
Association football clubs disestablished in 2021
1995 establishments in China
2021 disestablishments in China